Mt. Lebanon School District is the public school system in Allegheny County for residents of Mt. Lebanon, Pennsylvania, a suburb of Pittsburgh, Pennsylvania.

Schools
High School: Mt. Lebanon High School
Middle Schools: Jefferson Middle School, Mellon Middle School
Elementary Schools:' Foster Elementary School, Hoover Elementary School, Howe Elementary School, Jefferson Elementary School, Lincoln Elementary School, Markham Elementary School, Washington Elementary School

Notable alumni

 Eric Angle (class of 1986) – Professional wrestler
 Kurt Angle (class of 1987) – Professional wrestler and Olympic gold medalist
 Troy Apke (class of 2014) — NFL player
 Matt Bartkowski (class of 2006) – Professional hockey player
 Carl Betz (class of 1939) – Actor
 Mark Cuban (class of 1976) – Owner of NBA's Dallas Mavericks, panelist on Shark Tank'', entrepreneur
 Daya (class of 2016) – Recording artist
 Ave Daniell (class of 1933) – NFL player
 Scott Ferrall – Sports radio broadcaster
 Lex Staley – National morning show radio host
 Dave Filoni (class of 1992) – Animation director, voice actor, and writer
 John Frank (born 1962) – professional NFL football player—Pittsburgh
 Ian Happ (class of 2012) – Professional baseball player
 Terry Hart (class of 1964) – Astronaut
 Bob Hoag – Record Producer
 Gillian Jacobs (class of 2001) – Actress
 Paige Kassalen (class of 2011) – American electrical engineer who was the only American, female engineer, and youngest member of the ground crew for the Solar Impulse 2 project.
 Don Kelly (class of 1998) – Major League Baseball player
 Rich Lackner (class of 1975)– College football head coach
 Richard Lamm (class of 1953) – Three-term Governor of Colorado
 Vince Lascheid (class of 1942) - Pittsburgh Pirates and Penguins organist
 Dan London (class of 1991) – Actor
 Joe Manganiello (class of 1995) – Actor
 Andrew Mason (class of 1999) – Founder and CEO of Groupon
 Matt McConnell (class of 1981) – NHL play-by-play announcer
 William D. Morgan (class of 1966) – Congressional Medal of Honor Recipient, Corporal, United States Marine Corps – Republic of Vietnam, 1969
 Judith O'Dea (class of 1963) – Actress
 Dave Polsky – (class of 1982) writer, producer and creator of The Buzz On Maggie
 Bill Roth (class of 1984) – College sports play-by-play announcer
 George Savarese (class of 1985) – Educator and radio personality
 Rich Skrenta (class of 1985) – Computer programmer
 Ming-Na Wen (class of 1981) – Actress
 Josh Wilson (class of 1999) – Major League Baseball player

References

External links
 Mt. Lebanon School District website

School districts established in 1912
School districts in Allegheny County, Pennsylvania
Education in Pittsburgh area
Mt. Lebanon, Pennsylvania
1912 establishments in Pennsylvania